Alcomie is a rural locality in the local government area of Circular Head in the North West region of Tasmania.
The 2021 census recorded a population of 58 for Alcomie.

History
The locality was gazetted in 1959. Alcomie is the Aboriginal term for “beautiful view”.

Geography
The western part of the locality is farmland, while the south-east remains heavily timbered.

Road infrastructure
The C219 route (South Road) enters from the north-east and runs west, south and north-west before exiting, where it turns south along the western boundary for a short distance. Route C220 (Johns Hill Road) starts at an intersection with route C219 on the western boundary and runs away to the west.

References

Localities of Circular Head Council
Towns in Tasmania